Nedžad Ibrišimović, (20 October 1940 – 15 September 2011) was a Bosnian writer and sculptor. Between 1993 and 2001, he was a president of the Association of Writers of Bosnia and Herzegovina. He is best known for the novels Ugursuz (1968, Unfortunate) and Vječnik (2005), translated in English as Eternee (2010). In 2011 he was one of the founders of the Bosniak Academy of Sciences and Arts. Ibrišimović's novels have been translated into Czech, Turkish, Albanian, English, French, Spanish, German and Italian.

Bibliography
Kuća zatvorenih vrata, 1964.
Najbolji časovničar na svijetu (radio-play), 1967.
Pisac i njegova kreatura(radio-play), 1968.
Zlatni most (radio-play), 1968.
Ugursuz, 1968.
Zlá krev, Odeon, Praha, 1976;
3. izd. V. Masleša, Sarajevo, 1982;
Ogursezi. Perkhteu Musa Ramadani. Prishtine, Rilindija, 1988;
Ugursuz, Svjetlost, Sarajevo, 1984/85;
Ugursuz, Svjetlost, Sarajevo, 1991;
Ugursuz, Preporod, Sarajevo, 1996;
Ugursuz, Svjetlost, Sarajevo, 1997;
Ugursuz, Publishing, Sarajevo, 1999;
Karabeg, 1971.
Priče, 1972.
Glas koji je pukao o Egidiju (radio play), 1974.
Izvor (radio-play), 1977.
Živo i mrtvo, 1978.
Zmaj od Bosne, 1980.
Car si ove hevte, 1980.
Šamili tubakovi, 1984.
Nakaza i vila, 1986.
Drame, 1988.
Kuća bez vrata i druge priče, 1989.
Braća i veziri, 1989.
Dva dana u Al-Akru, 1991.
Knjiga Adema Kahrimana napisana Nedzadom Ibrišimovićem Bosancem, 1992.
Zambaci moje duše, 1993.
Izabrana djela I-X
Vječnik, 2005.
Eternee, 2010;
El-Hidrova knjiga, 2011.

References

1940 births
2011 deaths
Bosniaks of Bosnia and Herzegovina
Writers from Sarajevo
Bosniak writers
Bosniak poets
Artists from Sarajevo
Members of the Academy of Sciences and Arts of Bosnia and Herzegovina
20th-century Bosnia and Herzegovina writers
21st-century Bosnia and Herzegovina writers